Boca do Lixo (Garbage Mouth) is the popular name given to Santa Efigênia area between the streets Rua do Triunfo and Rua Vitória, in Luz neighborhood located in downtown of São Paulo. Boca was usually characterized by its night clubs and sexual services establishments. The area was also home to a flourishing cinema industry known as Mouth of Garbage Cinema, especially in the 1970s. It became known as Cracolândia ("Crack Land") in the 1990s, a surrounding identified with drugs, organised crime and violence. Today, Boca is a constantly policed area and crime rate has dramatically fallen.

Geography of São Paulo